Harjeet is a common Punjabi given name. Notable persons with that name include:

Harjeet Atwal (born 1952), Indian Punjabi writer
Harjeet Brar Bajakhana (1971–1998), Indian kabaddi player
Harjeet Singh (born 1960), Indian politician
Harjeet Singh (born 1992), Indian rapper, music composer and singer
Harjeet Singh (born 1996), Indian field hockey player